Michael Armstrong (born 1990 in Belfast, Northern Ireland) is a Northern Irish sportsperson.  He plays hurling with his local club O'Donovan Rossa, having previously played for Gort Na Mona and Davitt's, and has been a member of the Antrim senior inter-county team since 2011.

References

1990 births
Living people
O'Donovan Rossa (Antrim) hurlers
Antrim inter-county hurlers
Sportspeople from Belfast